KCXR (100.3 FM) is a radio station licensed to Taft, Oklahoma, United States. The station is currently owned by Jose Esteban Torres and Jose Moguel, through licensee Key Plus Broadcasting, LLC.

History
The station was assigned the call letters KHSA on December 14, 1989. On January 11, 1990, the station changed its call sign to KHJM, on January 10, 2003 to the current KCXR, 
on January 13, 2003 the station was sold to Kxoj, on December 6, 2004 the station was sold to Kxoj and on September 26, 2007 the station was sold to Kxoj.

On June 20, 2013, Stephens Media Group (KXOJ) sold KCXR-FM to Roger Chasteen's ABS Communications, Inc. out of Tulsa, OK. ABS Communications, Inc. also purchased KTFR and KEMX from Stephens Media Group at the same transaction; the sale price for the three stations was $500,000.

ABS Communications sold KCXR, KEMX, and KTFR to Key Plus Broadcasting effective August 19, 2015; the purchase price was $800,000.

On August 24, 2015 KCXR changed their format from Christian rock to regional Mexican, simulcasting KXTD 1530 AM.

References

External links

CXR